This is a list of Croatian soldiers, and it includes military personnel of Croatian origin ranging from early mediaval times to contemporary Croatian armies.

Medieval Croatian state

Croatian principalities (until 925)

Dalmatian Croatia

Pannonian Croatia

Kingdom of Croatia (925–1102)

Croatia in personal union with Hungary (1102–1527)

Croatia within Habsburg Monarchy (1527–1918)

Regular Habsburg army

Officers

Irregular military

Uskoci

Hajduci
 Andrijica Šimić – legendary hajduk
 Mijat Tomić – Croatian legendary Hajduk
 Luka Ibrišimović – Priest, Spy and Hajduk

Pandurs
 Baron Franjo Trenk – leader of Pandurs; father of military music

Rebel peasants

World War II (1941–1945)

Ustaše
 Andrija Artuković
 Jure Francetić
 Mile Budak
 Rafael Boban
 Miroslav Filipović
 Dido Kvaternik
 Slavko Kvaternik
 Josip Metzger
 Mladen Lorković
 Ljubo Miloš
 Tias Mortigjija
 Dinko Šakić
 Cvitan Galić
 Marko Mesić
 Vladimir Metikoš

Yugoslav Communist Partisans

Republic of Croatia (1991–present)

Croatian War of Independence 
The following is a list of distinguished Croatian soldiers from Croatian War of Independence listen in alphabetical order.

Croatia–NATO relations
Gordana Garašić

Foreign Armies

See also 

 Military history of Croatia

References

Soldiers
Croatian